Cole Caufield (born January 2, 2001) is an American professional ice hockey right winger for the Montreal Canadiens of the National Hockey League (NHL). He was drafted 15th overall by the Canadiens in the 2019 NHL Entry Draft.

Following success with the USA Hockey National Team Development Program (USNTDP), Caufield played for the University of Wisconsin-Madison for the 2019–20 and 2020–21 seasons. At Wisconsin, he won the Hobey Baker Award and was the leading goal and point-scorer for the 2020–21 NCAA season. 

Internationally, Caufield has represented the United States in numerous tournaments including winning a gold medal at the U17 WHC, a silver and bronze medal at the 2018 U18 WJC and 2019 U18 WJC respectively, and a gold medal at the 2021 World Junior Ice Hockey Championships.

Early life
Caufield was born in Mosinee, Wisconsin, to a hockey-playing family. He started skating at the age of two after seeing his older brother, Brock, skate. In addition to ice hockey, Caufield also played baseball and football as a child. His father, Paul, taught him to shoot from the right as he believed that right shots have an easier angle to access a goaltender's glove hand. He played Bantam AAA ice hockey for Team Wisconsin and played for Stevens Point Area Senior High School (SPASH), scoring 75 goals in two seasons for a total of 145 points before joining the USA Hockey National Team Development Program (USNTDP) in Plymouth, Michigan in 2017. On November 19, 2017, he made a verbal commitment to play collegiate hockey at the University of Wisconsin-Madison. 

In his first year with the USNTDP, Caufield led the combined U-17 and U-18 team with 54 goals and 26 assists, falling one goal short of Auston Matthews' single season record of 55 goals set during the 2014–15 season. In the 2018–19 season, he scored 72 goals and 28 assists, overtaking Phil Kessel's all time USNTDP goal record and Matthews' single season goal record. 

Leading up to the 2019 NHL Entry Draft, Caufield was considered a top prospect and was ranked eighth by the NHL Central Scouting Bureau amongst North American skaters. On June 21, 2019, he was drafted 15th overall in the first round by the Montreal Canadiens. He had been projected to be drafted higher, however, his size was a key contributor to why he was taken later in the draft. During the summer of 2019, he attended the Canadiens' development camp.

Playing career

Collegiate
Caufield played ice hockey for the Wisconsin Badgers from 2019 to 2021. During his rookie season, he recorded 19 goals and 17 assists in 36 games, leading the Big Ten in goals scored and winning the Big Ten scoring title. Following his rookie campaign, Caufield was selected to the Big Ten All-Freshman Team, First-Team All-Big Ten and was also the Big Ten Freshman of the Year, becoming the second Badger to win the award after Trent Frederic in 2017. 

After his freshman year, despite the uncertainty of the 2020–21 NCAA ice hockey season because of the COVID-19 pandemic, he opted to not turn professional with the Canadiens and returned for his sophomore season with Wisconsin, saying that "best thing for me was to come back, get another year, get stronger and faster and dominate more and become more of a leader".

During his sophomore season, he led the NCAA with 30 goals and 52 points in 31 games and was the first back-to-back Big Ten scoring champion. Following his outstanding season, he was selected to the NCAA East Regional All-Tournament Team and the Big Ten All-Tournament Team. He was also selected unanimously to First-Team All-Big Ten and as the Big Ten Player of the Year. On April 9, 2021, Caufield was named to the AHCA First-Team All-American and won the 2021 Hobey Baker Award as the top NCAA men's ice hockey player, becoming the second Badger to win the award after Blake Geoffrion in 2010.

Professional

2020–present
On March 27, 2021, Caufield ended his collegiate career, signing a three-year entry level contract with the Montreal Canadiens. After the conclusion of his sophomore season, he was first assigned to the Canadiens' American Hockey League (AHL) affiliate, Laval Rocket. He made his professional debut for the Rocket on April 9, recording two goals and one assist in a 5–3 win against the Toronto Marlies. After playing only two games for Laval, Caufield was recalled to the Canadiens' taxi squad on April 16 and was unable to be assigned to the Canadiens' active roster due to salary cap issues. After injuries to Paul Byron and Jonathan Drouin, on April 26, Caufield, as an emergency recall, made his NHL debut in a 2–1 victory over the Calgary Flames. On May 1, he scored his first NHL goal in a 3–2 overtime win over the Ottawa Senators. Two days later, in a 3–2 overtime win against the Toronto Maple Leafs, he became only the third player in NHL history to score their first two career goals in overtime. He concluded the NHL regular season with four goals and an assist in ten games played. 

After being a healthy scratch for the first two games in the first round of the 2021 Stanley Cup playoffs, on May 24, Caufield made his NHL playoff debut in a 2–1 loss against the Toronto Maple Leafs. On June 14, he scored his first NHL playoff goal in a 4–1 Stanley Cup semifinal loss against the Vegas Golden Knights. On June 24, he scored the go-ahead goal in the Canadiens' series-clinching win over Vegas. In the 2021 Stanley Cup Finals, Caufield recorded three assists en route to a series loss to the Tampa Bay Lightning. He ultimately appeared in twenty games with four goals and eight assists in the 2021 Stanley Cup playoffs.

Caufield entered the 2021–22 NHL season as a favorite to win the Calder Memorial Trophy. However, he struggled midst the Canadiens' poor start, recording a single assist in his first ten games. On November 1, he was sent down to play for the Laval Rocket, where he scored two goals and three assists in six games. The Canadiens recalled him to the roster on November 18. 

Both he and the team continued to struggle, and after thirty games played he had only one goal and seven assists. In February, new general manager Kent Hughes sacked coach Dominique Ducharme and replaced him with retired star forward Martin St. Louis. Caufield quickly saw his ice time increase under St. Louis, returning to the team's first line alongside Nick Suzuki and Josh Anderson, and scored six goals in his next seven games, along with four assists. He was named the team's player of the month for the first time for February. On March 15, Caufield scored two goals in eight seconds in a game against the Arizona Coyotes, the fastest two-goal performance for the Canadiens since Stéphane Richer in 1987. He was named the NHL's Rookie of the Month for March 2022, a period in which he led all rookies in goals (7) and total points (15). He was the first Canadiens player to receive this distinction since Carey Price in March 2008. In the final game of the season, Caufield scored his first career hat-trick in a 10–2 victory over the Florida Panthers. He finished the season with 23 goals, tied for second in rookie goal-scoring behind Tanner Jeannot of the Nashville Predators with 24.

The 2022–23 season was expected to be a development year for the rebuilding Canadiens. With Caufield and Suzuki an established duo on the team's first line, coach St. Louis began experimenting with different players in the other wing position. The early games saw Anderson, Sean Monahan and Mike Hoffman rotate through. The position was next given to Kirby Dach, the former 2019 third overall selection acquired by the Canadiens in the offseason with the initial expectation that he would play centre. The Caufield-Suzuki-Dach line generated strong initial results. On December 1, Caufield played his 100th career NHL game, and scored the game-winning goal, his 40th in the league. His 40 goals in his first 100 games was the fourth-highest for a Canadiens player in the preceding ninety years, behind only "Rocket" Richard, Jean Béliveau, and Bernie Geoffrion. After scoring 26 goals and 10 assists in 46 games, it was announced on January 21 that Caufield required surgery for a shoulder injury that he had been playing through for some time, and that as a result his season was over.

International play

Caufield has represented the United States internationally. In 2017, Caufield was selected to the World U-17 Hockey Challenge (U17 WHC), where he tallied eight goals and five assists in six games, helping the United States win a gold medal. He led the tournament in goals scored and was named to the U17 WHC All-Star Team. He helped the United States place first at the 2017 Four Nations Cup in Russia, he won gold, appearing in three games with six goals and one assist. At the 2018 IIHF World U-18 Championship, he notched six points in seven games, helping the team win a silver medal. 

Caufield would continue his stellar play internationally in the following season. In late 2018, the United States won the 2018 Five Nations Cup in the Czech Republic, as he recorded seven goals and two assists in four games. On April 27, 2019, Caufield tied Alex Ovechkin's single tournament goals record with 14 goals scored at the 2019 IIHF World U18 Championship (U18 WJC), en route to a bronze medal. He was named the Most Valuable Player, Best Forward, and to the U18 WJC All-Star Team for the tournament. 

In 2021, Caufield was selected to the IIHF World Junior Championship, recording two goals and three assists in seven games, helping the United States win a gold medal.

Personal life
Caufield's older brother, Brock, played for the Wisconsin Badgers men's ice hockey team. Their father, Paul, born in Sault Ste. Marie, Ontario, played for the University of Wisconsin–Stevens Point (UWSP) from 1988–92 and remains the team's all-time leading scorer. He returned to UWSP in 2002 to work as an assistant coach, but resigned in 2006 to assume his current position as manager of Ice Hawks Arena. Their grandfather, Wayne Caufield, a member of the Wisconsin Hockey Hall of Fame since 2011, played semi-professional hockey from 1963–76 for numerous teams, most notably the USHL's Milwaukee Admirals, and spent over two decades coaching youth hockey and managing hockey clinics in the Milwaukee area following his retirement. He died on July 13, 2018.

Career statistics

Regular season and playoffs

International

Awards and honors

Records
USA Hockey National Team Development Program:
 Most goals, career: 126 (2017–19)
 Most goals, IIHF World U18 Championships: 18 (2018, 2019)
 Most goals, regular season: 72 (2018–19)
 Most goals, single tournament: 14 (at the 2019 IIHF World U18 Championship)
 Most points by a Montreal Canadiens Rookie in overtime in a playoff year: 3 (2021)

References

External links
 

2001 births
Living people
AHCA Division I men's ice hockey All-Americans
American men's ice hockey right wingers
American people of Canadian descent
Ice hockey players from Wisconsin
Laval Rocket players
Montreal Canadiens draft picks
Montreal Canadiens players
National Hockey League first-round draft picks
People from Mosinee, Wisconsin
USA Hockey National Team Development Program players
Wisconsin Badgers men's ice hockey players